Cercidospora epipolytropa is a species of lichenicolous fungus in the genus Cercidospora but it has not been assigned to a family. It is known to parasitise the crustose lichen Lecanora polytropa. The fungus was first formally described by mycologist William Mudd in 1861. Ferdinand Christian Gustav Arnold transferred it to Cercidospora in 1874.

References

Dothideomycetes
Fungi described in 1861
Lichenicolous fungi